Eurofinance may refer to:

 EuroFinance - a division of Economist Group
 Evrofinance Mosnarbank - a large Russian commercial bank